Paul E. Johnson (born August 15, 1942 in Los Angeles, California) is an American historian and professor emeritus at University of South Carolina.

Life
Johnson earned his B.A. from the University of California, Berkeley, and graduated from the University of California, Los Angeles with a Ph.D. in 1975. He taught at Princeton University, Yale University, University of Utah, and University of South Carolina.

Awards
 1989–1990 Faculty Fellowship, Tanner Humanities Center at the University of Utah
 1995–1996 Guggenheim Fellowship

Works

 (7th edition Cengage Learning, 2019)

 A Shopkeeper's Millennium: Society and Revivals in Rochester, New York, 1815-1837 (Hill & Wang, 1978). (reissued Hill and Wang, 2004)

References

1942 births
Living people
University of California, Berkeley alumni
University of California, Los Angeles alumni
Princeton University faculty
Yale University faculty
University of Utah faculty
University of South Carolina faculty
21st-century American historians
21st-century American male writers
American male non-fiction writers